George Tuchet, 9th Baron Audley, 6th Baron Tuchet (died June 1560) was an English peer.

George Tuchet was the son of John Tuchet, 8th Baron Audley (born c. 1483). He married twice; firstly Elizabeth Tuke, daughter of Sir Brian Tuke before 30 August 1538 and secondly Joan Platt at Chester in 1559. He inherited his title by writ in 1557.

He died in June and was buried 3 July 1560 in St Margaret's Church, Westminster. He was succeeded by his only son, Henry Tuchet, 10th Baron Audley (died 1563).

References

 ThePeerage.com entry

|-

1560 deaths
09
16th-century English nobility
Year of birth unknown